Baron Kilbracken, of Killegar in the County of Leitrim, is a title in the Peerage of the United Kingdom. It was created in 1909 for the senior civil servant Sir Arthur Godley. He was Permanent Under-Secretary of State for India between 1883 and 1909.  the title is held by his great-grandson, the fourth Baron, who succeeded his father in 2006.

John Robert Godley was the father of the first Baron. Another member of the Godley family was General Sir Alexander Godley. He was the first cousin of the first Baron.

Barons Kilbracken (1909)
Arthur Godley, 1st Baron Kilbracken (1847–1932)
Hugh John Godley, 2nd Baron Kilbracken (1877–1950)
John Raymond Godley, 3rd Baron Kilbracken (1920–2006)
Christopher John Godley, 4th Baron Kilbracken (b. 1945)

The heir apparent is the present holder's son The Hon. James John Godley (b. 1972)

References

Kidd, Charles, Williamson, David (editors). Debrett's Peerage and Baronetage (1990 edition). New York: St Martin's Press, 1990, 

Baronies in the Peerage of the United Kingdom
Noble titles created in 1909
People from County Leitrim